Hypotia pectinalis is a species of snout moth in the genus Hypotia. It was described by Gottlieb August Wilhelm Herrich-Schäffer in 1838, and it is known from Spain, Sardinia, Corsica, Sicily, Israel, the Palestinian territories and Tunisia.

References

Moths described in 1838
Hypotiini
Moths of Europe